Washington Township is one of four townships in Brown County, Indiana. As of the 2010 census, its population was 4,896 and it contained 2,519 housing units.  The township includes the northern portion of Brown County State Park.

History
Washington Township was established in 1836.

The Brown County Bridge No. 36 and Theodore Clement Steele House and Studio are listed on the National Register of Historic Places.

Geography
Axsom Branch Pond and Terrill Ridge Pond are in this township.

Cities and towns
 Nashville

Unincorporated towns
 Annandale Estates
 Belmont
 Camp Roberts
 Clarksdale
 Gnaw Bone
 Mount Liberty
 Town Hill
 West Overlook
(This list is based on USGS data and may include former settlements.)

Adjacent townships
 Hamblen (northeast)
 Jackson (north)
 Van Buren (southeast)
 Benton Township, Monroe County (northwest)
 Camp Atterbury (northeast)
 Harrison Township, Bartholomew County (east)
 Polk Township, Monroe County (southwest)
 Salt Creek Township, Jackson County (south)
 Salt Creek Township, Monroe County (west)

Major highways
  Indiana State Road 46
  Indiana State Road 135

Cemeteries
The township contains eight cemeteries: Clark, Crouch, David, Dobbs, Hickory Hill, Marlett,  Pittman, South View, and Terrill.

References
 United States Census Bureau cartographic boundary files
 U.S. Board on Geographic Names

External links

 Foxfire Park  Located downtown Nashville, Foxfire Park is home to Festivals, Arts and Crafts Fairs, Car Shows, and home to the annual Fall Fine Arts Festival which showcases over 200 Artists from around the Midwest.
 Indiana Township Association
 United Township Association of Indiana
 Town of Nashville

Townships in Brown County, Indiana
Townships in Indiana
1836 establishments in Indiana